On September 27, 1911, the voters of Edmonton approved by plebiscite the amalgamation of Edmonton with Strathcona. A majority of Strathcona voters also voted in favour of amalgamation.

Amalgamation was effected February 1, 1912. In anticipation of this, no election was held December 11, 1911 as would normally have been required (municipal elections in Edmonton at the time being held the second Monday of every December).  Instead, elections were fixed for February 16, 1912.

Positions to be elected

With the amalgamation, Council's size was increased by two members, bringing the total number of aldermen to ten.

Due to a clause of the amalgamation agreement, in this election (and in each council hereafter to 1960) at least two of the elected councillors were required to come from the south side of the North Saskatchewan River.

In order to keep the staggered electoral system of aldermen in place, the five most popular of the aldermen elected in this election, (Henry Douglas, Charles Gowan, John Tipton, John Lundy, and Thomas J. Walsh), were elected to two-year terms, and the next five to one-year terms. The exception being that the most popular southside candidate was elected to a two-year term and the next-most-popular one to a one-year term.

In addition to electing city council, the February 1912 elections also elected the entirety of the seven member board of trustees for the public school division (four members - Walter Ramsey, B H Nichols, Samuel Barnes, and Frank Crang - to two-year terms, three others to one-year terms) and three of five members of the board of trustees for the separate school division (Wilfrid Gariépy and Milton Martin having been elected to two-year terms in 1910).

Voter turnout

There were 2870 ballots cast.  Information about the number of eligible voters is no longer available.

Results

(bold indicates elected, italics indicate incumbent)

Mayor

George S. Armstrong - 1791
Bryce J Saunders - 1072

Aldermen
Aldermanic election was conduced using Plurality block voting. Each voter could cast up to ten votes, About 17,000 votes were cast by the 2870 voters who participated in this election.

Elected
Henry Douglas - 1640 elected to two year term (candidate for the Retail Merchants Association)
Charles Gowan - 1230 elected to two year term
John Tipton - 1227 (South Side) elected to two year term
John Lundy - 1220 elected to two year term
James East (Labour-affiliated) - 1214 elected to one year term
Joseph Clarke - 1174 elected to one year term
Herman McInnes - 1164 elected to one year term
Thomas J. Walsh - 1049 (South Side) elected to two year term
Gustave May - 993  elected to one year term
Hugh Calder - 795 (South Side) elected to one year term

Not elected
D. B. Campbell - 835
J. H. McDonald - 779 (South Side)
J. J. Denman - 757
Thomas Grindley - 708
Thomas Malone - 707 (South Side) (candidate for the Retail Merchants Association)
J. Pollard - 659 (South Side)
George Elliott - 526 (South Side)
A. Boileau - 297

Public School Trustees
Election was conduced using Plurality block voting. Each voter could cast up to four votes.

Walter Ramsey - 1531
Bessie H Nichols* - 1446
Samuel Barnes - 1348
William Clark - 1145
John Park - 1139
Frank Crang - 839 (South Side)
J G MacKenzie - 610 (South Side)
(unsuccessful candidates not shown here)

Bessie Nichols was the first woman to run for public office in Edmonton. As a property owner or tenant, she was able to vote and she owned property in Edmonton so was not barred from running for that reason but her candidacy was not secure until an amendment to the city charter was rushed through the Alberta Legislature just before the election was held.

Separate (Catholic) School Trustees

John Cashman, James Collisson, and Joseph Henri Picard were elected.  Detailed results are no longer available.

References

 City of Edmonton: Edmonton Elections

1912-02
1912 elections in Canada
1912 in Alberta